Gordon ( 1863), or "Whipped Peter", was an escaped American slave who became known as the subject of photographs documenting the extensive scarring of his back from whippings received in slavery. The "scourged back" photo became one of the most widely circulated photos of the abolitionist movement during the American Civil War and remains one of the most infamous photos of that era. 

The New York Times writer Joan Paulson Gage noted, "The images of Wilson Chinn in chains, like the one of Gordon and his scarred back, are as disturbing today as they were in 1863. They serve as two of the earliest and most dramatic examples of how the newborn medium of photography could change the course of history." Most historians have accepted an 1863 Harper's Weekly article which consisted of a triptych of illustrations (all said to be of Gordon) and a narrative describing Gordon's escape from slavery and enlistment in the Union Army. However, the narrative was likely fabricated by Vincent Colyer, and Gordon and Peter are likely two different people.

Escape

Gordon escaped in March 1863 from the  plantation of John and Bridget Lyons, who held him and nearly 40 other people in slavery at the time of the 1860 census. The Lyons plantation was located along the west bank of the Atchafalaya River in St. Landry Parish, between present-day Melville and Krotz Springs, Louisiana.

To mask his scent from the bloodhounds that were chasing him, Gordon took onions from his plantation, which he carried in his pockets. After crossing each creek or swamp, he rubbed his body with the onions to throw the dogs off his scent.

Arrival at Union camp
New Orleans-based photographers William D. McPherson and his partner Mr. Oliver, who were in camp at the time, produced carte de visite photos of Gordon showing his back.

During the examination, Gordon said,

Ten days from to-day I left the plantation. Overseer Artayou Carrier whipped me. I was two months in bed sore from the whipping. My master come after I was whipped; he discharged the overseer. My master was not present. I don't remember the whipping.  I was two months in bed sore from the whipping and my sense began to come—I was sort of crazy.  I tried to shoot everybody.  They said so, I did not know.  I did not know that I had attempted to shoot everyone; they told me so.  I burned up all my clothes; but I don't recall that.  I never was this way (crazy) before.  I don't know what make me come that way (crazy).  My master come after I was whipped; saw me in bed; he discharged the overseer.  They told me I attempted to shoot my wife the first one; I did not shoot any one; I did not harm any one.  My master's Capt. John Lyon, cotton planter, on Atchafalya, near Washington, Louisiana. Whipped two months before Christmas.

Dr. Samuel Knapp Towle, Surgeon, 30th Regiment of Massachusetts Volunteers, wrote in a letter about meeting Gordon. He had expected him to be vicious due to the whip scars on his back. Instead, he said "he seems INTELLIGENT and WELL-BEHAVED." [Towle's emphasis]. Other physicians, like J.W. Mercer, Asst. Surgeon 47th Massachusetts Volunteers as well as a surgeon of the First Louisiana regiment (colored), said in 1863 that they had seen many backs like this and that when people talked of humane treatment of blacks, the photo of Gordon's back told the true story.

Service in Union Army

Gordon joined the Union Army as a guide three months after the Emancipation Proclamation allowed for the enrollment of freed slaves into the military forces. On one expedition, he was taken prisoner by the Confederates; they tied him up, beat him, and left him for dead. He survived and once more escaped to Union lines.

Gordon soon afterwards enlisted in a U.S. Colored Troops Civil War unit. He was said by The Liberator to have fought bravely as a sergeant in the Louisiana Native Guard during the Siege of Port Hudson in May 1863. It was the first time that African-American soldiers played a leading role in an assault.

Reactions to scars on his back
In July 1863 these images appeared in an article about Gordon published in Harper's Weekly, the most widely read journal during the Civil War. The pictures of Gordon's scourged back provided Northerners with visual evidence of brutal treatment of enslaved people and inspired many free blacks to enlist in the Union Army.

Theodore Tilton, editor of The Independent in New York stated in 1863: "This card-photograph should be multiplied by the hundred thousand, and scattered over the states.  It tells the story in a way that even Mrs. Stowe cannot approach; because it tells the story to the eye.  If seeing is believing—and it is in the immense majority of cases—seeing this card would be equivalent to believing things of the slave states which Northern men and women would move heaven and earth to abolish!"
 

The Atlantic editor-in-chief James Bennet in 2011 noted, "Part of the incredible power of this image I think is the dignity of that man. He's posing. His expression is almost indifferent. I just find that remarkable. He's basically saying, 'This is a fact.'"

In popular culture
 In the 2012 film Lincoln, Abraham Lincoln's son Tad views a glass plate of Gordon's medical examination photo by candlelight.
 American artist Arthur Jafa recreated the iconic image of Gordon as a sculpture titled Ex-Slave Gordon (2017). The work is made of vacuum-formed plastic and depicts Gordon's back from the waist up.
 Emancipation, a 2022 film based on Gordon's escape, starring Will Smith and directed by Antoine Fuqua, went into production in 2021, and was made available for streaming on December 9, 2022 on Apple TV+.

Gallery

See also
 List of photographs considered the most important
 List of slaves

References

Further reading

 
 
 
 
 

African Americans in the American Civil War
American rebel slaves
Year of birth missing
Year of death missing
People notable for being the subject of a specific photograph
19th-century American slaves
History of slavery in Louisiana
African-American history of Louisiana
People of Louisiana in the American Civil War
Union Army soldiers
Torture victims